The 2013 Kishtwar Riots, which claimed three lives and injured 80, was a conflict between Muslim and Hindu communities in Kishtwar, Jammu and Kashmir. The riots occurred in the aftermath of the Eid festival on 9 August 2013, and provoked a significant government lockdown in the Jammu region. Despite that, the government was criticized for not preventing the riots.

Initial clashes
The conflict started when a Hindu bike rider was trying to make their way through a procession of Muslims who were going for Eid prayers. The bike rider reportedly began a heated argument with members of the procession. This soon degenerated into a violent conflict between both religious communities. The riots led to the killing of one Muslim and two Hindus. Later, Muslim mobs moved through the market area, setting fire to the shops and homes of Hindus. Police were fired on from homes, leading to the confiscation of the weapons of Village Defence Committee members. People involved in the clashes initially threw stones; later, shops and houses were gutted. The situation was handled by the state government, who called in the army. The state government also prohibited the entry of politicians into affected areas, due to fears that the politicians' presence could further inflame tensions.

The riots killed three, left 80 others injured, and gutted over 100 houses and business establishments (mainly belonging to Hindus).

Aftermath

9 August
 A curfew was immediately imposed on the area and several changes were made in the administrative positions.

10 August
 Clashes continued in Paddar, with three injured.
 The state government stopped traffic along the national highway from Lakhanpur to Banihal and towards Doda and Kishtwar. 
 Amarnath Yatra, a pilgrimage to the Amarnath Temple, was cancelled due to tensions in the district.
 The Government of Jammu and Kashmir announced ex-gratia relief of 500,000 rupees to the relatives of Aravind Kumar Bhagat.
 Educational institutions remained closed.

11 August
 Mobile phone and Internet communications were suspended.
 The curfew was extended to Udhampur, Samba, and Kathua, along with Bhaderwah town in Doda, affecting seven of ten districts in the Jammu region.
 BJP Leader of the Opposition in the Rajya Sabha Arun Jaitley was prevented from entering Kishtwar, to prevent further escalation of violence.

12 August
 Fresh violence broke out in Hidyal village, part of Kishtwar, where a Muslim mob consisting of armed members attacked a Hindu neighborhood. 10 injured, including an ASP.
 Minister of State for Home Sajad Kichloo resigned.

14 August
 Almost 150 people were arrested, including some local Hurriyat leaders, as the police cracked down on miscreants responsible for violence in the region. Over 100 people involved in stone pelting and arson were arrested in several parts of the Jammu region.
 Internet services for mobile phone and Wi-Fi users remained suspended for the fourth day across Jammu and Kashmir. Internet speeds for broadband services were reduced to check the upload of objectionable material to social networking sites.

15 August
 The curfew was lifted in seven districts of the Jammu region, except for Kishtwar, where a 4-hour morning relaxation is given.

Arrests
As of August 13, 2013, a total of 141 people had been taken into custody, in connection with the incidents. Nearly 40 weapons looted from a Kishtwar arms shop remained missing.

Administrative failure
Administrative failure was cited as the reason for Kishtwar clashes. The Central Security establishment mentioned issues such as:
 Low police strength.
 Possible failures in assessing the gravity of the situation, related to lack of staff during Eid.
 Failure to call in the two companies of Sashastra Seema Bal deployed in the area as reinforcement.
 No deployment of CRPF in the district. The CRPF, which had 60 companies in the state to maintain law and order, was called into Kishtwar on only the second day of the riots.

The home ministry had issued an advisory asking the Government of Jammu and Kashmir to prevent violence from spreading further by deploying adequate forces in all parts of the state.

Reactions
The reactions of some politicians are listed below in their original form.

References

2013 crimes in India
2013 in India
2013 riots
2010s in Jammu and Kashmir
Human rights abuses in Jammu and Kashmir
Kishtwar district
Riots and civil disorder in India